The Dhulbahante is a Somali clan family, part of the Harti clan which itself belongs to the largest Somali clan-family — the Darod. They are the traditional inhabitants of the physiographic Nugaal in its topographic sense, and its pre-independence administrative sense, which included Doollo. The clan's progenitor is buried at Badweyn.

The Ali Gheri clan were the first tribe to adopt the Dervish (Daraawiish) identity. Colonial administrator Douglas Jardine, stated the following about Dervish demographics:

The supreme Garad of the Dhulbahante is currently Garad Jama Garad Ali.

Overview 

The extended formal name of Dhulbahante, the clan's forefather was Said Saleh Abdi Mohamed Abdirahman bin Isma'il al-Jabarti whose resting place is Badweyn. According to Somali tradition, his mother hailed from the of Arap clan of the Isaaq clan-family. This maternal connection has enticed a mutual affinity between the two clans.

The primary homeland of the clan straddles the Haud region and the Nugaal Valley, hence segments of the clan who settle in either plateau are colloquially referred to as the Reer Hawd and Reer Nugaaled. Currently, the clan has 13 active Garads. The most senior Garaad of these traditional leaders is Garad Jama Garad Ali who succeeded his uncle Garad Abdiqani Garad Jama. The use of the traditional hereditary title of Garad (which is most widespread among the Dhulbahante), was first inaugurated by the great ancestor Garad Shirshore who previously served as a Ugaas.

The clan boasts a history of anti-colonial resistance. In a bloody war against the British Empire the Dhulbahante along with several other clans propelled the Dervish movement to defeat the empire in a series of military expeditions. The rebellion caused the death of one-third (or 200,000) of the population of the Somaliland protectorate, most severely effecting the Dhulbahante clan with whom there was no treaty of protection. John Drysdale and Ioan M. Lewis, who had conducted research in British Somaliland in the 1950s, noted that there was not that much of an attachment of the clan to Dervish history at that time. Nevertheless, to honor the Dervish freedom fighters, the name Daraawiish is now given to almost all regional paramilitaries in Somalia.

Distribution 

In Somaliland, the Dhulbahante almost exclusively inhabit the Sool region. Michael Walls on the Dhulbahante and Sool says:
 "The residents of Sool overwhelmingly hail from a single clan grouping in the form of the Dhulbahante [...]. Sool boasts a degree of kinship homogeneity that is rare even in the Somali Horn".

The clan inhabits Taleh, most of Hudun and most of Las Anod districts, in Sool, Sanaag Toghdeer regions. In a survey conducted in 2011 of Las Anod District 92.5% of the respondents identified as Dhulbahante whilst 2.5%, 1.5% and 1.3% identified as Hawiye, Bantu and Isaaq respectively. In the Sanaag region the clan is only present in the Erigavo district along with the Habr Yonis and Habr Je'lo clans, whilst well represented in the regional capital of Erigavo. Similarly in Togdheer, the clan solely lives in the district of Buuhoodle. The district of Buuhoodle was made a region by the state of Puntland and its name was changed to Cayn in 2004. Hence, the popular abbreviation SSC which denotes the traditional Dhulbahante territories within Somaliland.

In Somalia, they inhabit the Jubaland state, where there is a long settled Dhulbahante trading community in the port city of Kismayo and its surrounding district, in southern Somalia.

In Ethiopia, the Dhulbahante clan settle in the Somali Regional State. They are present in the Dollo Zone, specifically in the woredas of Boh, Danot and Werder, in Ciid.in Ciid In Kenya, there is a small but notable Dhulbahante community in the North Eastern Province. During the Darawiish era, the Bah Udgoon, a Qayaad division had a garesa (dervish fortification) at Qollad near modern Galmudug. During arid soil conditions, contemporary pastoral Dhulbahante nomads likewise divagate halfway towards the Puntland coast.

The Dhulbahante exclusively settle in the northern Somali cities of Las Anod and Buuhoodle. Moreover, they are well represented in the cities of Erigavo and Garowe. The Baho Nugaaled, particularly the Ugaasyo Dhulbahante, are the most geographically dispersed, with towns such as Yoocada in Las Anod district and Bandar Salam in Middle Juba. According to Roy Irons, Dhulbahante were the largest subclan of the northern clans during the onset of colonialism.

Somali academic Said Sheikh Samatar stated that the Nugaal, which is formed of the Nugaal plateau beneath the Cal range, and the Nugaal valley in the Sool province, is a Dhulbahante territory, and the site of the biggest Darawiish confrontations:

 The climate of the Nugaal, a region which constitutes the heartlands of the Dulbahante, is highly suited for breeding and rearing ponies... The country of the Dulbahante is the prize of pastoral habitat: well-watered and well-pastured, the Nugaal valley provides a welcome sanc-tuary from the perennial twin scourges of Somali pastoralism, thirst and starvation... Demoralized and disorganized, the Dervishes were forced to disperse all over the Nugaal and the Haud after their resounding defeat by the British expeditionary force. Not only did they sustain heavy casualties (7,000 to 8,000 in dead and injured) but also the loss of 20,000 of their best war-horses

The pre-independence Nogal District partly corresponding with modern Sool, was described as "entirely Dolbahanta" by John Hunt.  British Colonial Officer John Anthony Hunt, whose word was regarded by Berbera's colonial office as "The Koran, the Bible" described the Dhulbahante as the owners of the Nugaal, the head of the Nogal valley in Badwein being where the clan progenitor/ancestor is buried.

History

19th century 
19th-century explorer C.J Cruttenden on the Dhulbahante and their Suleiman horse breed:
 "The Dulbahanta are a nation who fight chiefly on horseback, their arms being two spears and a shield. Their horses are powerful and courageous; the breed descended, according to Somali tradition, from the stud of Suleiman, the son Of David, and consequently is highly valued. The Dulbahanta, as far as I have seen of them, are a fine martial race of men, second to none...either in conduct or appearance".

The clan boundary between the Habr Je'lo, a clan of the Isaaq clan-family, and the Dhulbahante clan during the 19th century was traditionally in Laba Garday, situated between War Idaad and Wadamago.

The Dhulbahante traditionally had two adjacent kingdoms:

Markus Hoehne described the 19th century existence of a northern Dhulbahante kingdom and a southern Dhulbahante kingdom as follows:

Dervish Period 

Dervish forces mostly hailed from the Dhulbahante. The Dhulbahante in Buuhodle were particularly the first and most persistent supporters of the Dervish Movement. Höhne on the Dhulbahante and the Dervish Movement states:

 "The majority of them came from the Dhulbahante clan. Members of this clan were camel herders and renown warriors (Cruttenden 1849). The British had not concluded a ‘treaty of protection’ with them, as they had done with the inhabitants of the coast, who belonged to various Isaaq or Dir clans."

Along with the Dhulbahante, the Ogaden, and segments of the Isaaq such as the Habr Je'lo and eastern sections of the Habr Yunis clan loyal to Sultan Nur were part of the Movement. The Dervish Movement resisted colonial occupation, especially the British who were aided by Isaaq troops.

The Achilles heel of the British empire in the Somaliland Protectorate was the un-administered east, inhabited by the Dhubahante, Warsangali and a few sections of the Isaaq. In this light Douglas Jardine explains that British priority was to keep the former two clans neutral, as the British administration and its allied clans would not be able to resist them without outside aid.

The British found it exceptionally difficult to administer the hinterland in the east, as Jess reports "in 1901 a joint Anglo-Ethiopian expedition of almost 17,000 men failed to accomplish anything other than to drive the Mullah temporarily across the border into the Mijertein". In later years, the British increased their engagement with the hinterland to suppress the movement, yet the previously "insignificant corner of the Empire" proved to be exasperating and costly both financially and in human life.

The British consistently intended the demise and destruction of the Dhulbahante who were avid Dervishes. In this Regard, British Commissioner Eric Swayne was delighted in their slaughter of the Dhulbahante clans.

Dervish raids on the Dhulbahante

In July 1901, the British made attempts to expel the Dervish Movement out of the Dhulbahante territory, to achieve this they devised a plan to crush "the Dhulbahante who willingly and persistently assisted" the dervishes. A British colonial Officer, Roy Irons believed the Dhulbahante joined the Dervish movement more out of fear rather than ideological devotion and in order to demonstrate British supremacy and power over these clans it was necessary to crush them. Roy Irons, the author of Churchill and the Mad Mullah of Somaliland notes:
Sections of the Dhulbahante like the Reer Hagar of the Farah Garad and other sections inhabiting Buuhoodle fought alongside the British against the Dervishes after being raided by the Mullah's forces. Dhulbahante friendlies would also sometimes raid the Dervishes, looting their livestock as well as weapons. The book A Fine Chest of Medals: The Life of Jack Archer reports:

In 1904 the Dervishes attacked the Jama Siad sub-division of the Mohamoud Garad clan. The Dervishes looted 400 camels while killing two men. The Parliamentary Debates (official Report).: House of Commons in 1913 notes:

The British War Office similarly notes that apart from the Farah Garad sub-division the rest of the Dhulbahante clan joined out of fear of the Mullah or by personal gain:

In 1908 the Dhulbahante once again raided the Dervish and looted their camels. Hassan sent a letter to the British Commissioner Cordeaux, requesting his camels be returned and blood money be paid.

An excerpt from Hassan's letter to Cordeaux reads:Your people, the Dolbahanta tribe, have killed fifteen of our men and looted eighty-four camels. I do not know if Abdulla Shahari reported this to you: if he did the fault lies with you; if not, I do hereby acquaint you of it. You are requested to restore to us our camels and the blood shed by your people 

In 1912 the Dervish army compelled friendly segments of the Dhulbahante clan to retire to the British controlled territory to gain protection. This was after the Mullah had constantly launched raids that took a heavy toll on the clan. World War 1 at Sea - Contemporary Accounts reports:

The Farah Garad subclan was also raided by the Dervishes, specifically the Ali Gheri subclan, who were set upon and attacked by Hassan and his Dervish army, forcing them to evacuate and seek refuge in Burao, Berbera and Haud among the Isaaq clans. British colonial governor Horace Byatt reported that 800 Dhulbahante refugees arrived in Berbera, but feared that they could not be protected nor fed properly, stating that only 300 native infantry and 200 King's African Rifles were in Berbera and insufficient to hold off a Dervish attack. Byatt also raised concerns for the Dhulbahante refugees en route to British controlled territory and the possibility of them being looted by hostile clans, particularly the Habr Yunis. Baron Ismay in his intelligence report on the Dervish raids on the Ali Gheri and the Dolbahanta clan's of Bohotle notes:No important move was made till November 1911, when he successfully attacked the Ali Gheri at Bohotleh. He followed this up in February 1912 with an attack on the Dolbahanta at Eildab, In this engagement our people lost all their stock and were reduced to starvation. They flocked to Berbera demanding to be supported. Yet another attack on Bohotleh in March resulted in the remaining Dolbahanta in that vicinity being looted and driven out. Bohotleh remained in Dervish hands.In June 1913 the Farah Garad subclan suffered yet another Dervish raid on their towns at Udaweina. General Richard Corfield had in response moved out to the area with his troops to support the shaken Farah Garad, who retreated westwards towards the lands of the Habr Yunis:

However, the Dhulbahante were not trusted by some British generals. For instance, the British general Eric Swayne at times regarded the clan as too untrustworthy to be enlisted as a levy:
British colonial administrator Sir Douglas Jardine describing the plight of the Dhulbahante noted:The most pitiful lot of all fell to certain sections of the Dolbahanta. Ousted from their ancestral grazing grounds by the Mullah's advance and bereft of all their stock, the remnants wandered like veritable Ishmaelites in the Ishaak country, deprived of Asylum and almost all access to the coast.

In 1913 at the battle of Dul Madoba the Dervishes defeated the British. The Dervish forces under the leadership of Dhulbahante military commander Ismail Mire were attacked by British expeditionary forces made up of 107 rank and file and 9 extras, thus a total of 116, under the command of Richard Corfield, with 300 accompanying Dhulbahante leaving the battlefield before the first shot was fired. The Darawiish had previously looted the region between Burao and Idoweyne.  The British sustained heavy casualties and Corfield was killed in battle, reportedly at the hands of Darawiish Ibraahin Xoorane and Axmed Aarey, and the spoils of war were distributed in Buuhoodle and Taleh.

After the 1920 bombing campaign of the fortress at Taleh, and the Dervish retreat into Ethiopia, the tribal chief Haji Mohammad Bullaleh, who commanded a 3,000 strong army that was loyal to the British Empire and consisted of Isaaq and Dhulbahante horsemen pursued the Dervish army. They attacked Muhammad Abdallah Hassan and the Dervish army in the Ogaden region and defeated them, causing Hassan to retreat to the town of Imi. Haji and his army looted 60,000 livestock and 700 rifles from the dervishes.

Politics

Assassination of Garad Ali 
During the colonial period, the Chief of the Dhulbahante clan, Garad Ali Garad Mohamoud, did not want to be under British occupation nor under Dervish authority, instead he wanted to retain his autonomy as clan chief. The Garad and Sayyid Mohamed Abdullah Hassan had a heated altercation which concluded with Garad Ali supposedly saying:
 "I am the Ruler of Nugaal and its people, their management is mine and I expect everybody to respect it".

Subsequently, Hassan ordered the assassination of the Garad. As Douglas Jardine reports, Hassan took this action after the Garad reassured the British that their relations remained unchanged, although owing to the influence of Hassan his clan no longer obeyed his orders. Issa-Salwe says news of the assassination stunned the Somali clans, consequently Dervishes were only left with the Bah Ali Geri of the Dhulbahante. According to John William Carnegie Kirk, most Dhulbahante clans sided with the Dervishes, expect the three sub-clans of Rer Hagar, Rer Wais Adan and Ba Idris among others who were considered friendly by the British.

In 1959, Garad Ali of Dhulbahante led the foundation of the United Somali Party which forged a political coalition of the non-Isaaq clans of the British Somaliland protectorate. The party won 12 of 33 seats in the House of Representatives in the 1960 general elections. After the unification of the Somali Republic the party united with the Somali Youth League. Later in the aftermath of the Somali Civil War in the 1990s the party re-emerged under the leadership of Mohamed Abdi Hashi this time with a mission to unify the Harti clans under Puntland.

During Mohamed Siad Barre's regime, the clan was part of an alliance of Darod clans that was presumed to dominate state authority in Somalia. The acronym MOD was used to refer to the alliance which was composed of the Marehan, Ogaden and Dhulbahante.

In early 1993, the Dhulbahante held a conference in Boocame while Somaliland's second national conference was underway in Borama. The result of the conference was the establishment of a 33-member council (Khusuusi) which would administer the Sool, Sanaag, and Cayn regions in the absence of a central government in Somalia.

State formations 

In 1998, the Dhulbahante established the State of Puntland with other Harti clans due to common kinship. Hence, based on this ethnic composition and clan ties to Puntland, voters in Sanaag and especially Sool were decidedly less supportive of Somaliland's 2001 referendum on the constitution and independence. Although the Dhulbahante community was split over the 2007 conflict, with some aligning with Somaliland and its troops in the area of Las Anod, in the Bo'ame Declaration of 2007 all Dhulbahante clan chiefs rejected Somaliland's secessionist agenda and demanded the withdrawal of its militia from the clans traditional territory.

In aftermath of Somaliland taking control of Las Anod in 2007, the clan became disillusioned with Puntland, consequently the SSC Movement which aimed to remove Somaliland from Dhulbahante territories emerged. The movement was called the Unity and Salvation Authority of the SSC Regions of Somalia), and it was spearheaded by Saleban Essa Ahmed and founded in 2009. The most important traditional leaders who lent their support to the SSC Movement were Garad Jama Garad Ali, Garad Jama Garad Ismail, and Garad Ali Burale Hassan.

In the Kalshale Conflict, Somaliland forces and SSC militia clashed in the Ayn region in 2011, whilst more clashes were reported to have occurred in 2012.

In 2012, the SSC movement was replaced by Khatumo State after the Khaatumo II conference held at Taleh. The conference was a development with up to 5,000 people from the Dhulbahante community gathering in the town.

Under the leadership of Ali Khalif Galaydh, Khatumo State commenced peace talks with Somaliland and subsequently the two entities reached an agreement at the town of Aynabo in October 2017 with Khatumo joining Somaliland, ceasing to exist. Nonetheless, the Dhulbahante still seek a united Somalia and overwhelming oppose Somaliland's independence aspirations.

Boocame declaration
An historic summit was convened in Boocame from November 15 – November 23 of 2007, by the traditional leaders of the Dulbahante (Dhulbahante) sub-clan of the clan. The Dulbahante traditional chiefs issued an official communiqué on October 15, 2007, regarding the secessionist Somaliland region's militias’ aggression and occupation of Laascaanood (LasAnod), the regional capital of Sool, Sanaag and Cayn regions of Somaliland.
 
All 14 major traditional chiefs of the Dulbahante clan attended this summit. In addition to the traditional chiefs, there were many intellectuals (women & men), students and civic organizations from outside and inside of the country attending the summit. All chiefs unanimously signed declaration communiqué on November 22, 2007.

The communiqué states that the Dulbahante clan is not part of (and was never part of) and does not recognize the administration that calls itself "Somaliland" and that there are no agreements between Dulbahante clan and "Somaliland", in the past or the present. The communiqué also calls for an immediate end of hostility, return of customary peaceful co-existences among clans and an unconditional removal of the Somaliland militia from their territory. Finally, chiefs declared that the Dulbahante clan stands for the Somali unity.

In the anniversary of their historic summit in Boocame in November 2007, the Dulbahante Traditional Chiefs (SSC Traditional Leaders Council) reiterated their previous declaration (above) that they are not part of the Somaliland separatist movement. The council sent its pronouncement to the European Union, United Nations Agencies and all NGOs that operate within Somalia.

Architecture

Dhulbahante garesa 
In the official Dervish-written letter's description of the 1920 air, sea and land campaign and the fall of Taleh in February 1920, in an April 1920 letter transcribed from the original Arabic script into Italian by the incumbent Governatori della Somalia, the airstriked fortresses were described as twenty-seven Dhulbahante garesas the British captured from the Dhulbahante clan:

Contemporary
Khatumo was responsible for building two airports in the 2010s, initially at Taleh, and subsequently at Buuhoodle.

Hass Petroleum, owned by a Dhulbahante is co-developing the Pinnacle Towers project in Nairobi along with White Lotus Group, a Dubai-based investment firm.

Sub-clans 
The clan is divided into two major sub-clans: Mohamoud Garad and Farah Garad. The other sub-clans amalgamate in a loose political and social clan confederation referred to as Baho Nugaaled.

The Dhulbahante has a varying assortment of political subdivisions which in order of size include the highest-level segmentations such as Mohamoud Garad, disparate Dhulbahante political alliances such as Shiikhyaale and Dharbash, xeer groups or chief caaqil groups such as Bah Cali Geri (including Farah Adan & Odala Samakab) or Ararsame (including Wacays Adan and Reer Hagar), and the smallest, the dia-paying groups, such as Rikhaaye subclan of Naleeye Ahmed, the Farah Hagar subclan of Ararsame, or Ebirar subclan of Baho Nugaaleed.

The gaashaanbuur xeer group or chief caaqil group is smaller with a lower level agnation than garaad guud (supreme garaad) group, although larger and a higher level agnation that the typical dia group. Of these three levels of segmentation, only the chief caaqil group is simultaneously tied to a xeer (heer) group. For example, heer laws presented to the Nugal district commissioner in 1947 by various gaashaanbuur xeer groups or chief caaqil groups were as disparate as disavowing endogamy, regarding insults at a shir (council) as liable to a payment of a 150 shilling fine, and ingraining patriarchal norms. Pre-independence, the Farah Garad had three chief caaqils, including the Baharsame, which likewise represented Yasin Garad, the Ararsame chief caaqil (Reer Hagar), which likewise represented Wacays Adan, and the Bah Cali Gheri chief Caaqil, which likewise represented a oneling segmentation:

The Ararsame chief caaqil represents the Ararsame twin duo (Hagar and Wacays Adan), whilst the Bah Cali Geri chief caaqil is a oneling segmentation.

Segmentation 
There is no clear agreement on the clan and sub-clan structures and many lineages are omitted. Within the Dhulbahante clan, according to the anthropologist I.M. Lewis, the Dhulbahante are divided into 50 groups which pay diyya (or blood money for their members). These are gathered into four lineages of unequal size: the Muuse Si'iid, who made up the majority of the clan circa 1960, and in turn is highly segmented into numerous lineages; the Ahmed Si'id also known as Hayaag, which Lewis estimated to number 1,000 male members at the time, and the Mohamed Si'iid, and the Yuunis Si'iid, which he described as "small, insignificant, and incapable of independent political action." The following summarized clan tree presented below is taken from John Hunt's A general survey of the Somaliland Protectorate (1944-1950):

Abdirahman bin Isma'il al-Jabarti (Darod)
 Mohamed Abdirahman (Kabalalah)
 Abdi Mohamed (Kombe)
Salah Abdi (Harti)
Said Abdi (Dhulbahante)

Notable figures

Dynasties 
 Soofe dynasty of the Bah Ali Gheri
 Bulay dynsaty of the Barkad
 Amey dynasty or Kooreeye dynasty of Ararsame
 Shirshoore dynasty of Baharsame and Dhulbahante in general
 Ali Xaram dynasty of the Maxamuud Garaad

Dynasts 
 Garad Abdiqani Garad Jama, Former Garad of the Dhulbahante and the first delegate to table the case for Somaliland's secession at the Burao Grand Conference of 1991
 Garad Jama Garad Ali, Garad of the Dhulbahante Clan.
 Xasan Deyl, chief caaqil of Bah Cali Gheri during independence
 Garaad Abdulahi Garaad Soofe, first chief caaqil of Bah Cali Gheri in the 21st century
 Yuusuf Kooreeye, chief caaqil of Ararsame during and prior to independence
 Omar Amey, the chief caaqil of Ararsame during colonialism
 Maxamed Cali Bulay, chief caaqil of Barkad during colonialism

Prime ministers 
 Ali Khalif Galaydh, Ex-Prime minister of Somalia and Khaatumo President.
 Xaashi Suni Fooyaan, Dervish peace-time prime minister

Presidents 
 Abdihakim Amey, former Puntland vice-president.
 Abdisamad Ali Shire, former Puntland vice-president.
 Ahmed Elmi Osman, Former President of Khaatumo and Incumbent Vice President of Puntland.
 Mohamed Yusuf Jama, former Khatumo president.
 Mohamed Abdi Hashi, President of Puntland.

Dervishes 
 Ali Suji, highest ranked Shiikhyaale general in 1903
 Ismail Mire, latter Shiikhyaale supreme commander, poet.
 Ibraahin Xoorane, assassinator of Richard Corfield

Enterprisers 
 Abdinasir Ali Hassan, Chairman of Hass petroleum.
 Hodan Nalayeh, Somali-Canadian journalist.
 Abdi Holland, Somali artist.
 Aw Jama, Somali scholar, historian and collector of oral literature of Somalia. He wrote the first authoritative study of Dervishes.
 Saado Ali Warsame, singer-songwriter and former MP in the Federal Parliament of Somalia.
 Ali Dhuh, retorting poet.
 Amina Mohamed, former Chairman of the INM and the WTO's General Council, and the current Secretary for Foreign Affairs of Kenya.
 Abdi Bile, Somalia's most decorated athlete with the most Somali national records.
 Mohamed Suleiman, first ethnic Somali to win an Olympic medal.

Security 
 Mohamed Adam Ahmed, former Chief of Staff of the Somali Armed Forces.
 Abdi Hassan Mohamed, Incumbent Police Commissioner of the Somali Police Force.
 Mohamed Isse Lacle, Colonel in the Somali Navy and Former Deputy Minister of Ministry of Ports in Somaliland.
 Saleban Essa Ahmed, SSC Leader.

Politicians 
 Bashe Mohamed Farah, Speaker of Somaliland House of Representative.
 Faisal Hassan, Canadian politician.
 Ibraahim Guure, natural resources minister of Khatumo
 Ali Jangali Somalia's minister of foreign affairs.
 Ahmed Gacmayare, former Information Minister for Khaatumo State.
 Yasin Haji Mohamoud, Foreign Minister of Somaliland.
 Abdiqani Mohamoud Jidhe, Somaliland appointed Governor of Sool.
 Abdirahman Mohamed Abdi Hashi, Former Somali Minister of Fisheries.
 Mohamoud Diriye Abdi Joof, former Khaatumo Minister.

Notes

References 

Somali clans
Somali clans in Ethiopia